The 1915 New York Giants season was the franchise's 33rd season.  The team finished eighth in the eight-team National League with a record of 69–83, 21 games behind the Philadelphia Phillies.

Opening day game
Opening day was April 14, 1915, at the Polo Grounds against the Brooklyn Dodgers with 20,000 attendees. Mayor John Purroy Mitchel threw the ceremonial first pitch. The New York Giants Opening Day starting pitcher was Jeff Tesreau. The Giants won 16 to 3.

Regular season 
After finishing first in 1911, 1912, and 1913 and second in 1914, the Giants fell to last place in the National League in 1915. Much of the collapse was due to the pitching staff. Hall of Famers Christy Mathewson and Rube Marquard both struggled through subpar seasons. Marquard would be placed on waivers in August and claimed by the Brooklyn Robins.

Season standings

Record vs. opponents

Roster

Player stats

Batting

Starters by position 
Note: Pos = Position; G = Games played; AB = At bats; H = Hits; Avg. = Batting average; HR = Home runs; RBI = Runs batted in

Other batters 
Note: G = Games played; AB = At bats; H = Hits; Avg. = Batting average; HR = Home runs; RBI = Runs batted in

Pitching

Starting pitchers 
Note: G = Games pitched; IP = Innings pitched; W = Wins; L = Losses; ERA = Earned run average; SO = Strikeouts

Other pitchers 
Note: G = Games pitched; IP = Innings pitched; W = Wins; L = Losses; ERA = Earned run average; SO = Strikeouts

Relief pitchers 
Note: G = Games pitched; W = Wins; L = Losses; SV = Saves; ERA = Earned run average; SO = Strikeouts

Awards and honors

League top five finishers 
George Burns
 #4 in NL in runs scored (83)

Larry Doyle
 NL leader in batting average (.320)
 #2 in NL in runs scored (86)

Pol Perritt
 #3 in NL in losses (18)

Jeff Tesreau
 #2 in NL in strikeouts (176)

External links
1915 New York Giants season at Baseball Reference

References

New York Giants (NL)
San Francisco Giants seasons
New York Giants season
New York G
1910s in Manhattan
Washington Heights, Manhattan